Crocker is a census-designated place located in Pierce County, Washington.

Demographics
In 2010, it had a population of 1,268 inhabitants. 716 are male. 552 are female.

Geography
Crocker is located at coordinates 47°04′51″N 122°06′14″W.

References

Census-designated places in Pierce County, Washington